A New Astronomy is the fourth album by the Italian psychedelic rock band Jennifer Gentle, released in 2006 by Sub Pop Records and A Silent Place.

Track list
 Lost Aurora
 Hidden Flower
 Red Apple Devil
 Hollow Earth Theory
 Sex Rituals Of The Dead
 Hiss From Nowhere
 The Cannibal Club
 Church Of The Black Emptiness
 “What Did You Say?”
 A Classification Of Clouds
 Music From Mars
 Last Aurora
 Me And Joe On The Moon

References

2006 albums
Sub Pop albums
Jennifer Gentle albums